Crime Doctor may refer to:

 Crime Doctor (character), a fictional criminal psychologist in a radio and film series
 Crime Doctor (film) (1934), first movie in the series
 Crime Doctor (radio program)
 The Crime Doctor (1934 film), an unrelated 1934 film starring Otto Kruger
 Crime Doctor (comics), a comic book villain from DC Comics
 The Crime Doctor, a book by Ernest William Hornung